Alfa Omega TV is a Romanian Christian media organization, operating a TV channel with a similar name. It was launched on 11 June 2006 and the network broadcasts 24 hours a day, 7 days/week. The audiovisual license was given in December 2005.

Since 2010, the Alfa Omega TV channel was on the Romanian Audiovisual Authority's (CNA) list of must-carry programs for cable operators, being among the first 25 most-watched TV channels in Romania.

Alfa Omega TV rebranded for the first time on 8 July 2016. Plus, the format became a full 16:9 image format.

Alfa Omega TV channel is broadcast free-to-air via satellite over Europe, North Africa and the Middle East. The reception parameters (as of July 2018) are below: 
Satellite:  Eutelsat 16A, 16 degrees east
Frequency:  12717 MHz
Polarization:  Horizontal
Symbol rate:  7500 Ks/s
FEC:  3/4

References

Television stations in Romania
Television channels and stations established in 2010
Christian media